The 1949 All-Eastern football team consists of American football players chosen by various selectors as the best players at each position among the Eastern colleges and universities during the 1949 college football season.

All-Eastern selections

Quarterback
 Arnold Galiffa, Army (AP-1)

Halfbacks
 George Sella, Princeton (AP-1)
 Hillary Chollet, Cornell (AP-1)

Fullback
 Bob Zastrow, Navy (AP-1)

Ends
 Dan Foldberg, Army (AP-1)
 Tom Rowe, Dartmouth (AP-1)

Tackles
 Richard Clark, Cornell (AP-1)
 Holland Donan, Princeton AP-1)

Guards
 John Schweder, Penn (AP-1)
 Bernie Barkouskie, Pitt (AP-1)

Centers
 Bob Numbers, Lehigh (AP-1)

Key
 AP = Associated Press

See also
 1949 College Football All-America Team

References

All-Eastern
All-Eastern college football teams